The Hirota Cabinet is the 32nd Cabinet of Japan led by Kōki Hirota from March 9, 1936, to February 2, 1937.

Cabinet

References 

Cabinet of Japan
1936 establishments in Japan
Cabinets established in 1936
Cabinets disestablished in 1937